State Route 375 (SR 375), also known as Lakeshore Drive, is an  state highway located in Grainger County, in the U.S. state of Tennessee.

It connects US 25E with SR 92, traveling along the north coast of Cherokee Lake.

Route description
Lakeshore Drive begins at SR 92 in Cherokee and goes east-northeast following closely to Cherokee Lake to Bean Station. The highway winds and cuts through rural unincorporated Grainger County. Farms, marinas, and lakefront housing developments scattered along the route. It curves its way along the shores of lake before crossing arm of the lake via German Creek Bridge, and leaves the shoreline of Cherokee Lake before ending at the intersection of US 25E-SR 32 in Bean Station.

Major intersections

References

Transportation in Grainger County, Tennessee
375